Ophiocaryon is a small genus of flowering plants in the family Sabiaceae found mainly in the Guayana Shield  and Amazon  basin in South America.

Species
Ophiocaryon neillii Aymard  &  Daly (Ecuador)
Ophiocaryon klugii Barneby (Brazil, Colombia, Peru)
Ophiocaryon heterophyllum (Benth.) Urban (Brazil, Colombia, Ecuador, Peru)
Ophiocaryon chironectes Barneby (Brazil-Guyana border
Ophiocaryon duckei Barneby (Brazil, Peru
Ophiocaryon paradoxum R. Schomburgk  (Guyana)
Ophiocaryon maguirei Barneby (Guyana)

References

Eudicot genera
Sabiaceae